Meadows Games was a developer and manufacturer of coin-operated video games established by Harry Kurek as a subsidiary of his contract manufacturing company, Meadows Manufacturing, in 1974.  Kurek established the company because he felt the economy of the United States was headed into a recession and he wanted to enter a business he felt would be "recession proof."  The company scored a major hit with its 1974 release Flim-Flam, a cocktail-table ball-and-paddle game that sold over 12,000 units.  Subsequent games were not as successful, and Kurek sold the company to Holosonics in 1978.  Holosonics closed the company down the next year.

Games
3-D Bowling (1978)
Bigfoot Bonkers (1976)
Bombs Away (1976)
Ckidzo (1976)
Cobra Gunship (1976)
Deadeye (1978)
Drop Zone 4 (1975)
Flim Flam II (1975)
Flim-Flam (1974)
Gridiron (1979)
Gypsy Juggler (1978)
Lazer Command (1976)
Meadows 4 In 1 (1976)
Meadows Lanes (1977)

References

Video game development companies